Kanteikulia, sometimes spelled Kanteikolia, is a small village and panchayat in Angul district, Odisha, India. The Khandanal River flows near the village. It is surrounded by sal forest. The panchayat covers an area of  Kanteikulia contains a notable Hindu temple, dedicated to Shiva.

An upper primary school, a post office and an ayurvedic dispensary situated there.

References

Villages in Angul district